The Gerousia (γερουσία) was the council of elders in ancient Sparta. Sometimes called Spartan senate in the literature, it was made up of the two Spartan kings, plus 28 men over the age of sixty, known as gerontes. The Gerousia was a prestigious body, holding extensive judicial and legislative powers, which shaped Sparta's policies. 

Ancient Greeks considered that the Gerousia was created by the mythical Spartan lawgiver Lycurgus in his Great Rhetra, the constitution of Sparta.   

The gerontes were elected through peculiar shouting elections, which were open to manipulation, especially from the kings.

Membership 

The Gerousia consisted of thirty members in total. Twenty-eight elected members (called gerontes) and the two kings, who were members by right, entering the chamber upon their accession. Unlike the kings, the 28 gerontes had to be at least 60 years old—the age when Spartan citizens were no longer required to serve in the army. Membership of the Gerousia was for life, which made the gerontes' position very prestigious within Spartan society.

The electoral procedure is known thanks to Plutarch, who wrote in the 2nd century AD, but whose source was a lost study on the Spartan constitution by Aristotle. There was no ballots, the gerontes were elected by shouting. The candidates passed one by one before the Spartan citizens, who therefore shouted according to their preference. The loudness of the shouts was assessed by a jury confined into a windowless building, who then declared winner the candidate with the loudest shouts. Aristotle considered this system "childish", probably because influential people (such as the kings) could easily manipulate the elections.

The gerontes were likely drawn from a limited aristocracy composed of only a few families, sometimes called the kaloi kagatoi. Modern scholars have debated since the 19th century on whether these families had a legal privilege on Gerousia membership, or just a de facto monopoly. Of the latter opinion, G. E. M. de Ste. Croix compared the situation in Sparta with that of Roman Republic, where a few gentes monopolised senior magistracies, notably thanks to their patronage network—a practice likely prevalent in Spartan politics.

As the kings were by right members of the Gerousia, they usually entered the chamber well before the age of sixty and served much longer terms than the ordinary gerontes, which they could use to build their influence there. Several shrewd kings, such as Cleomenes I or Agesilaus II, developed over the years such a network of supporters among the gerontes that they de facto controlled the Gerousia, therefore Sparta's external and internal policies. This patronage of the gerontes by a king is illustrated by the story reported by Plutarch of Agesilaus II offering an ox and cloak to every new member of the Gerousia.

Paul Cartledge notes that when a king was absent, his nearest relative could cast a vote for him in the Gerousia, which means that at least two gerontes besides the kings were of royal stock (one for each dynasty) and further shows the influence that the kings had on the electoral procedure, as they could engineer the elections of their relatives.

The Gerousia was probably reformed by the king Cleomenes III (r.235–222), who made the gerontes elected annually. No longer elected for life, the source of the gerontes' prestige was removed and the Gerousia became a more pliable chamber as a result.

Functions

Supreme court 
The Gerousia served as the court in charge of capital cases. A king could even be prosecuted before a special court of 34 members, made of the Gerousia and the five ephors (the defendant king could not sit in the Gerousia during the trial). A famous case was the trial of king Pausanias in 403; accused of betrayal for having restored democracy in Athens, he was nonetheless acquitted by a 19-15 decision, in which the other king Agis II had cast his vote against him. Thanks to this judicial power, the gerontes were able to significantly influence foreign policy, although they had no constitutional power in that field, because the fear of prosecution before the Gerousia compelled Spartan officials to follow the gerontes' opinion. For example, in 371 the king Cleombrotus was advised by his friends to energetically wage war against Thebes to avoid a later trial.

Probouleusis 
The Gerousia debated motions which were to be put before the citizen assembly, with the power to prevent any motion from being passed on. The Great Rhetra suggests that it had the power to overturn decisions made by the Spartan assembly.

Legacy 
The name Gerousia continued to be known in Laconia in the Deep or Mesa Mani known as the "Gerontikoi" until recent times.

In the Parliament of modern Greece, the name of the upper house was Gerousia between 1844–1864 and 1927–1935.

Notes

References

Ancient sources 
 Plutarch, Parallel Lives (Lycurgus, Agesilaus).

Modern sources 
 
 Paul Cartledge, Agesilaos and the Crisis of Sparta, Baltimore, Johns Hopkins University Press, 1987. 
 —— & Antony Spawforth, Hellenistic and Roman Sparta, A tale of two cities, London and New York, Routledge, 2002 (originally published in 1989). 
 G. E. M. de Ste. Croix, The Origins of the Peloponnesian War, London, Duckworth, 1972. 
 
 R. D. Hicks, "A Supposed Qualification for Election to the Spartan Senate", The Classical Review, Vol. 20, No. 1 (Feb., 1906), pp. 23-27.
 
 Anton Powell (editor), A Companion to Sparta, Hoboken, Wiley, 2018. 
 G. E. M. de Ste. Croix, The Origins of the Peloponnesian War, London, Duckworth, 1972. 
 
 

 Government of Sparta
 Ancient Greek titles
Defunct unicameral legislatures